Malda Airport  is located at Malda, India. Situated at an elevation of 791 feet, it is 3 km from the city centre and covers a rough area of around 140 acres. It has a runway measuring 3600 by 100 feet and is unpaved. Small aircraft and helicopters can land here. The terminal was built to handle 20 passengers each on arrival and departure at a time.
There were weekly services available to Kolkata and Balurghat operated by Vayudoot till 1989 when the services were withdrawn. As of 2017 the airport is under reconstruction.

See also
 List of airports by ICAO code
 List of airports in India

References

External links 
 

Airports in West Bengal
Transport in Maldah
Maldah